Earl Bennett (born March 23, 1987) is a former American football wide receiver who is currently the director of player development at Vanderbilt.

Earl Bennett may also refer to:

 Earl Fred Bennett (November 5, 1919 – October 4, 2007), American comic actor and musician best known for his work with Spike Jones
 Earl Clinton "Jug" Bennett (February 27, 1920 – September 28, 1992), former guard in the National Football League.